Eopsetta is a genus of righteye flounders native to the North Pacific Ocean.

Species
There are currently two recognized species in this genus:
 Eopsetta grigorjewi (Herzenstein, 1890) (Shotted halibut)
 Eopsetta jordani (Lockington, 1879) (Petrale sole)

References 

 
Pleuronectidae
Marine fish genera
Taxa named by David Starr Jordan